Ilka Stitz (born 22 October 1960) is a German writer of historical thrillers.

Biography 
Stitz was born in Hanover, Germany. She studied art history, German studies and classical archaeology in Göttingen and Cologne. Her interest in Roman history and many visits to historical sites in Turkey inspired her to write historical novels.

She now resides and works in Cologne. Together with Karola Hagemann, she formed the writing duo of Hagemann & Stitz, which under the pseudonym "Malachy Hyde" has to date written six novels and five short stories.

Select bibliography 
with Karola Hagemann
1999 (as Malachy Hyde) Tod und Spiele, Diederichs
2002 (as Malachy Hyde) Eines jeden Kreuz, Weitbrecht
2004 (as Malachy Hyde) Wisse, dass du sterblich bist
2006 (as Hagemann & Stitz) Das Geheimnis des Mithras-Tempels, Grafit 2006, 
2007 (as Malachy Hyde) Gewinne der Götter Gunst
2009 (as Hagemann & Stitz) Jung stirbt, wen die Götter lieben, Grafit 2009, 

Short stories
2010: Mit eiserner Zunge, in: Der Ring der Niedersachsen, Zu Klampen Publisher
with Karola Hagemann:
2004 Das Vermächtnis der Colonia Ulpia Traiana, in: Mord am Niederrhein, Grafit Publisher
2004 Das Gold der Erde, in: Tatort FloraFarm, Juwi Macmillan Publisher
2005 Die Götter sind müde in: Mords-Feste. Kalenderkrimis vom Tatort Niederrhein, Leporello Publisher
2006 Die Venus von Schloss Dyck in: Radieschen von unten. Leporello Publisher 2006, 
2009 Die Entflammten in: Das steinerne Auge. Bookspot Publisher

References

External links
Ilka Stitz website
Hagemann & Stitz website

1960 births
Living people
21st-century German novelists
German women short story writers
Writers from Hanover
University of Cologne alumni
German women novelists
21st-century German women writers
21st-century German short story writers